Vuk Malidžan (born January 14, 1988) is a Serbian professional basketball player for Dunav of the Basketball League of Serbia.

Professional career 
Malidžan played for the Superfund BP (Second League of Serbia), and for OKK Beograd and Dunav Stari Banovci of Basketball League of Serbia. He was selected as the First League MVP in 2014–15 season. Prior to 2017–18 season, he signed for Mladost Zemun.

Malidžan also played abroad for the Varda HE (Bosnia and Herzegovina), Helios Domžale (Slovenia) and Nokia (Finland).

References

External links 
 Player Profile at realgm.com
 Player Profile at eurobasket.com

1988 births
Living people
Basketball players from Belgrade
Basketball League of Serbia players
BC Nokia players
OKK Dunav players
KK Dynamic players
KK Mladost Zemun players
OKK Beograd players
MBK Handlová players
KK Superfund players
Point guards
Serbian expatriate basketball people in Bosnia and Herzegovina
Serbian expatriate basketball people in Finland
Serbian expatriate basketball people in Slovakia
Serbian expatriate basketball people in Slovenia
Serbian men's basketball players
Helios Suns players